Belknap County is a county in the U.S. state of New Hampshire. As of the 2020 census, the population was 63,705. The county seat is Laconia. It is located in New Hampshire's Lakes Region, slightly southeast of the state's geographic center. Belknap County comprises the Laconia, NH Micropolitan Statistical Area, which in turn constitutes a portion of the Boston-Worcester-Providence, MA-RI-NH-CT Combined Statistical Area.

The southwestern half of Lake Winnipesaukee lies in Belknap County, while several other major lakes such as Squam Lake and Lake Winnisquam lie partially or wholly within the county.  The Belknap Mountains lie along the shore of Winnipesaukee east of Laconia and feature Mount Major, known for its numerous hiking trails and Gunstock Mountain, home of a popular ski resort.  Bank of New Hampshire Pavilion is a concert venue in Gilford which features major national touring music acts, while the Laconia Motorcycle Week attracts hundreds of thousands of visitors every June.  Funspot Family Fun Center, located in Weirs Beach, is the largest video game arcade in the world.

History
Belknap County was organized in 1840 by removing parts of northeastern Merrimack County and northwestern Strafford County. It is named for Dr. Jeremy Belknap, a renowned preacher, historian, and author of The History of New Hampshire. The first County Court was held within the town of Meredith, at a village known as Meredith Bridge on the Winnipesaukee River. In 1855, the town of Laconia was separated from Meredith.

Geography
It is the second-smallest county in New Hampshire by area. Most of the county's water area is part of Lake Winnipesaukee.

Adjacent counties
 Carroll County (north)
 Strafford County (east)
 Merrimack County (southwest)
 Grafton County (northwest)

Demographics

2000 census
As of the census of 2000, there were 56,325 people, 22,459 households, and 15,496 families living in the county. There were 32,121 housing units at an average density of 80 per square mile (31/km2). The racial makeup of the county was 97.61% White, 0.29% Black or African American, 0.30% Native American, 0.55% Asian, 0.02% Pacific Islander, 0.16% from other races, and 1.06% from two or more races.  0.74% of the population were Hispanic or Latino of any race. 17.2% were of English, 13.6% Irish, 13.3% French, 12.2% French Canadian, 8.5% American, 6.9% Italian and 5.7% German ancestry. 95.0% spoke English, 2.7% French and 1.2% Spanish as their first language.

There were 22,459 households, out of which 30.4% had children under the age of 18 living with them, 55.7% were married couples living together, 9.20% had a female householder with no husband present, and 3% were non-families. 24.40% of all households were made up of individuals, and 9.70% had someone living alone who was 65 years of age or older.  The average household size was 2.45 and the average family size was 2.91.

In the county, the population was spread out, with 23.60% under the age of 18, 6.70% from 18 to 24, 28.10% from 25 to 44, 26.40% from 45 to 64, and 15.10% who were 65 years of age or older.  The median age was 40 years. For every 100 females, there were 97.10 males.  For every 100 females age 18 and over, there were 95.10 males.

The median income for a household in the county was $43,605, and the median income for a family was $50,510. Males had a median income of $34,741 versus $25,445 for females. The per capita income for the county was $22,758.  About 4.50% of families and 6.10% of the population were below the poverty line, including 7.60% of those under age 18 and 4.90% of those age 65 or over.

2010 census
As of the 2010 United States Census, there were 60,088 people, 24,766 households, and 16,609 families living in the county. The racial makeup of the county was 96.6% white, 1.2% Asian, 0.5% black or African American, 0.2% American Indian, 0.2% from other races, and 1.3% from two or more races. Those of Hispanic or Latino origin made up 1.2% of the population. In terms of ancestry, 20.8% were English, 20.7% were Irish, 8.5% were Italian, 8.0% were German, 7.1% were French Canadian, and 6.6% were American.

Of the 24,766 households, 28.5% had children under the age of 18 living with them, 52.5% were married couples living together, 9.8% had a female householder with no husband present, 32.9% were non-families, and 25.7% of all households were made up of individuals. The average household size was 2.39 and the average family size was 2.84. The median age was 44.7 years.

The median income for a household in the county was $54,929 and the median income for a family was $64,875. Males had a median income of $46,378 versus $34,690 for females. The per capita income for the county was $28,517. About 5.2% of families and 8.6% of the population were below the poverty line, including 8.7% of those under age 18 and 10.0% of those age 65 or over.

Politics and government
Belknap County has become the most Republican county in New Hampshire: the Republican Party is the majority political party in the county, holding all 18 of its seats in the General Court as of January 2021. Since 1888, only three Democrats have won Belknap County: Woodrow Wilson in 1912 when the Republican Party was mortally divided between William Howard Taft and Theodore Roosevelt; 1964, when Lyndon B. Johnson swept the Northeast due to Republican Barry Goldwater's conservative views regarding the Civil Rights Movement; and 2008, when Barack Obama swept every county in New England bar one. In 2020, Senator Jeanne Shaheen became the first Democrat to win Belknap County in a Senate race in over 50 years.

|}

County Commission
The executive power of Belknap County's government is held by three county commissioners, each representing one of the three commissioner districts within the county.

In addition to the County Commission, there are five directly elected officials: they include County Attorney, Register of Deeds, County Sheriff, Register of Probate, and County Treasurer.

General court
The legislative branch of Belknap County is made up of all of the members of the New Hampshire House of Representatives from the county. In total, there are 18 members from nine different districts. After the 2022 elections, the party distribution and representatives were as follows.

Communities
There are ten towns and one city in Belknap County.

City
 Laconia (county seat)

Towns

 Alton
 Barnstead
 Belmont
 Center Harbor
 Gilford
 Gilmanton
 Meredith
 New Hampton
 Sanbornton
 Tilton

Census-designated places
 Alton
 Belmont
 Meredith
 New Hampton
 Tilton Northfield

Villages

 Alton Bay
 Center Barnstead
 Gilmanton Ironworks
 Glendale
 Lakeport
 Lochmere
 Weirs Beach
 Winnisquam

See also
 National Register of Historic Places listings in Belknap County, New Hampshire

References

External links

 
 National Register of Historic Places listing for Belknap County

 
Counties in Greater Boston
1840 establishments in New Hampshire
Populated places established in 1840